Arne Svingen (born 1967) is a Norwegian writer of children's books. He also writes adult fiction and books for young adults. He has published over a hundred titles and his works have been translated into more than a dozen languages.

His most noted books are: 
 Svart elfenben, winner of the Brageprisen in 2005
 Sangen om en brukket nese, winner of the Kulturdepartementets litteraturpris in 2012, Prix Libbylit Romans Ados in 2015, and the Batchelder Honor Book Award in 2017
 Man dør litt hver dag, winner of the Østfoldungdommens kritikerpris in 2017 
 podcast Svingens barnebokverden, winner of the NBU-prisen in 2018 
 En himmel full av skyer, winner of the Bokslukerprisen in 2019/20

References

Norwegian children's writers
Living people
1967 births